South Korean boy band Big Bang have embarked on eleven headlining concert tours, two of which have been worldwide, and six others in Japan. The group made their headlining debut in December 2006 through The R.E.A.L concert at Olympic Gymnastics Arena. In 2008, they embarked on their first Asian tour, The Global Warning Tour, visiting South Korea, Japan and Thailand. In 2009 and 2010, the band toured Japan on The Electric Love Tour and began annual concerts in Seoul called The Big Show. In 2011, after a two-year hiatus, the group released their EP Tonight, and planned to support the album with a world tour. However, multiple members encountered legal issues and the tour was cancelled. They visited Japan on their Love and Hope Tour, with part of the proceeds going to the 2011 Tōhoku earthquake and tsunami disaster relief.

In 2012, BigBang embarked on their first world tour, The Alive Galaxy Tour, in support of their album Alive, which marked the first time for the group to tour North America, Europe, and South America. In total, 800,000 people attended the tour worldwide. In 2013 and 2014, the members focused on their solo careers, with G-Dragon, Taeyang and Daesung undertaking solo concert tours. Meanwhile, the group toured Japan twice, on their Japan Dome Tour and Japan Dome Tour “X”, which grossed $73 million and $71 million respectively. In 2015, the group began releasing material from their third Korean-language studio album Made, and embarked on their second world tour, The Made World Tour. The concert was critically acclaimed and received rave reviews from The New York Times, The Guardian, Los Angeles Times, Grantland, and Billboard. The tour broke multiple records, becoming the most attended tour headlined by a Korean artist in history with a record attendance of 1.5 million people worldwide, and listed on Pollstar's Year-end Top 200 North American Tours for 2015. In 2016, BigBang celebrated their tenth anniversary, embarking on the 0.TO.10 tour, holding concerts in Japan, Seoul, and Hong Kong, which were attended by more than 1.1 million people. In 2017, four members of BigBang (excluding T.O.P) embarked on The Last Dance Tour, their last tour before their upcoming hiatus due to mandatory military service in Korea. Throughout their career, the band as a group and as solo acts, have performed to over 10 million people worldwide, and since their first Japanese dome tour in 2013, the band has performed to over 4.2 million fans for five consecutive years until 2017 in the country.

Concert tours

Concerts
The following concerts were held at Olympic Gymnastics Arena in Seoul, South Korea.

Other tours

See also
 List of Big Bang solo concert tours

References

External links
Official Site
YG Entertainment

 
Big Bang
Lists of concert tours of South Korean artists
Lists of events in South Korea
South Korean music-related lists